Astrothelium philippinense is a species of corticolous (bark-dwelling), crustose lichen in the family Trypetheliaceae. Found in the Philippines, it was formally described as a new species in 2016 by lichenologists André Aptroot and Felix Schumm. The lichen has a smooth and shiny, pale ochraceous-green thallus with a cortex and a thin (0.1–0.4 mm wide) brown to black prothallus line. The presence of the lichen induces galls in the host plant, leading to the formation of numerous wart-like structures about 1–2 mm wide. No lichen products were detected in collected samples of the lichen using thin-layer chromatography. The ascospores of A. philippinense number four per ascus. They are hyaline, ellipsoid, and muriform (divided into many chambers by several transverse and longitudinal septa), with dimensions of 125–170 by 30–35 μm.

References

philippinense
Lichen species
Lichens described in 2016
Lichens of Malesia
Taxa named by André Aptroot